The following is the list of episodes from the American prime time television soap opera Falcon Crest, which aired for nine seasons on CBS from December 4, 1981 to May 17, 1990.

Series overview

Episodes

Season 1 (1981–82)

Season 2 (1982–83)
{{Episode table |background=#E38181 |overall=5 |season=5 |title=17 |director=14 |writer=29 |airdate=14 |prodcode=16 |episodes=

{{Episode list
|EpisodeNumber=21
|EpisodeNumber2=3
|Title=Troubled Waters
|DirectedBy=Harry Harris
|WrittenBy=Stephen Black & Henry Stern
|OriginalAirDate= 
|ProdCode=203
|ShortSummary=Richard Channing aggressively seeks to buy the Agretti land. During a dinner, he provokes Carlo into splashing wine in his face. Carlo also clashes with Lance and Angela over Lance's disrespect towards Melissa. Chase tries to sell wine to Canada than another distributor and Angela agrees. At a session of the Board of Supervisors, Angela claims that the water in Falcon Crest's reservoirs is tainted. The county health inspector confirms this but, after pressure from Chase, issues another report declaring the water safe. Maggie, working on a screenplay for Hollywood, is suffering from writer's block. Mario and his mother leave the valley, leaving a devastated Vickie running home. After another clash with Cole, Carlo surprisingly phones Cole to apologize and invites him over to see Melissa. Unbeknownst to Cole, Carlo did at the point of a gun. When Cole arrives at the Agretti mansion, he finds Carlo dead on the floor. He immediately calls an ambulance but becomes the prime suspect in the process. News of the murder reaches Angela and Melissa during a meeting of The Globe'''s board of directors.
|LineColor=#E38181
}}

}}

Season 3 (1983–84)
{{Episode table |background=#81A6E3 |overall=5 |season=5 |title=17 |director=14 |writer=29 |airdate=14 |prodcode=16 |episodes=
{{Episode list
|EpisodeNumber=41
|EpisodeNumber2=1
|Title=Cimmerian Dawn
|DirectedBy=Harry Harris
|WrittenBy=Robert McCullough
|OriginalAirDate= 
|ProdCode=301
|ShortSummary=The Channings and Giobertis, including Chase's  cousin, Dr. Michael Ranson (Cliff Robertson), attend the funeral of Jacqueline Perrault. After they left, Richard also pays his respects to his mother. He also exploits Julia shooting his mother on The Globe's front page. The revelation that Julia murdered Carlo Agretti also drives a wedge between Lance and Melissa, who resumes her affair with Richard. In jail, Julia rebuffs her mother's attempts to get her released on bail. She also reveals (to Emma and Chase) that she had secret affair with Carlo and that he threatened to make the affair public if Julia wouldn't help him take over Falcon Crest. Julia also starts to run into trouble with fellow inmates. At the hospital, Chase eventually wakes from his coma but finds himself paralyzed.

 |LineColor=#81A6E3
}}

}}

Season 4 (1984–85)

Season 5 (1985–86)
When this new season began, Falcon Crest had started with the regular practice a recap to remind the viewers of the previous episode's recollections, before a short sneak preview of the new episode, prior to the main title. Midway throughout the season, Jane Wyman had been absent for only 2 episodes, due to her abdominal surgery.

Season 6 (1986–87)
This was Robert Foxworth's final year, during which he also directed some episodes. Midway throughout the season, Michael Reagan, Jane Wyman's real-life son, had a recurring role as the concierge in a hotel.

Season 7 (1987–88)
Due to the largest number of rotating guests on Falcon Crest, and of budget constraints, five main characters (Brett Cullen, Margaret Ladd, John Callahan, Dana Sparks and Chao-Li Chi) didn't appear in several episodes of this season.

Season 8 (1988–89)
The show focused heavily on the new cast members (Kristian Alfonso, David Beecroft, Brandon Douglas, Cástulo Guerra and Danny Nucci). Two of the former cast members (Robert Foxworth and Abby Dalton) did not return. Ana Alicia played two different characters and Jane Wyman's poor health resulted in the show's episodes being reduced from 28 to 22.

Season 9 (1989–90)
This is the final season of Falcon Crest'' and the only season in which Jane Wyman does not appear in nearly every episode, due to her ongoing health problems. The show went into a different direction by adding 2 new cast members (Gregory Harrison and Wendy Phillips), who replaced Susan Sullivan. Against her doctors' orders, Jane Wyman appeared for the show's final 3 episodes.

References

External links
 

Episodes
Lists of American drama television series episodes
Lists of soap opera episodes